The Latin Rite Catholic Archdiocese of Santa Fe de la Vera Cruz ( in Argentina and is a metropolitan diocese.  Its suffragan sees include Rafaela and Reconquista.

History
On 15 February 1897 Pope Leo XII founded the Diocese of Santa Fe from territory taken from the Diocese of Paraná.  On 20 April 1934 the diocese was elevated to an archdiocese by Pope Pius XI.  On the same date it lost territory to create the dioceses of Diocese of Mendoza.  It lost further territory when the dioceses of Resistencia (1939), Reconquista (1957) and Rafaela (1961) were created.  Blessed John Paul II changed the name of the archdiocese to the Archdiocese of Santa Fe de la Vera Cruz on 19 September 1992. The archdiocese has also had a history of sex abuse allegations, with one recently resulting in current bishop Sergio Fenoy being criminally charged in July 2020 for attempting to supplant an investigation.

Bishops

Ordinaries
Juan Agustín Boneo (1898–1932)
Nicolás Fasolino (1932–1969) (Cardinal from 1967)
Vicente Faustino Zazpe (1969–1984)
Edgardo Gabriel Storni (1984–2002) 
José María Arancedo (2003–2018)
Sergio Alfredo Fenoy (2018–present)

Coadjutor archbishop
Vicente Faustino Zazpe (1968–1969)

Auxiliary bishops
Rafael Canale Oberti (1921–1956)
Nicolás de Carlo (1936–1940), appointed Bishop of Resistencia
Manuel Marengo (bishop) (1950–1956), appointed Bishop of Azul
Enrique Principe (1957–1974)
Edgardo Gabriel Storni (1977–1984), appointed Archbishop here

Other priest of this diocese who became bishop
Antonio Caggiano, appointed Bishop of Rosario in 1934 (Cardinal in 1946)

Territorial losses

External links

References

Roman Catholic dioceses in Argentina
Roman Catholic Ecclesiastical Province of Santa Fe de la Vera Cruz
Religious organizations established in 1897
Roman Catholic dioceses and prelatures established in the 19th century